They Crawl is a 2002 American science fiction horror film directed by John Allardice, and written by Curtis Joseph and David Mason. The film stars Daniel Cosgrove, Tamara Davies, Dennis Boutsikaris and Mickey Rourke. The film is about giant killer cockroaches and was released in Italian television on March 1, 2001. It was subsequently released direct to video in some other countries.

External links
 

2001 films
2001 horror films
American science fiction horror films
CineTel Films films
2000s science fiction horror films
2000s American films